Russell is an unincorporated urban community in the Municipality of Russell – Binscarth, Manitoba.

It is located along PTH 16 and PTH 83, and is at the western terminus of PTH 45. The community is home to 1,611 people as of the 2011 census.

The community was designated as a town prior to 1 January 2015, when it and the nearby Village of Binscarth amalgamated with the Rural Municipality of Russell. 

Russell is the home of Manitoba's Beef and Barley Festival, which is held annually in October to celebrate the region's strong agricultural tradition. Grain farming and cattle ranching are extensive in the surrounding areas.

History 
European-Canadians first settled the area around Russell around 1880. The first post office began operations at a site north of the present community in 1880, and was called "Shell River". The closest Canadian Pacific Railway (CPR) point was renamed to Russell in 1889, named after Lord Alexander Russell. Also in 1889, a Barnardo's Home for boys was established, which, along with local farmers, sponsored transportation for British orphans to come to the area to work on farms.

Russell was officially incorporated as a town in 1913.

Demographics 

Economy 
Changes to agriculture, such as the elimination of the Western Grain Transportation Subsidy in 1995, have put the region in a unique position. With one of the highest freight rates in western Canada, the Russell area is well-positioned to experience an explosion in value-added processing.

Nearby potash mining in Saskatchewan provides jobs for numerous Russell residents, as well as purchasing supplies and services locally. The first potash mine in Manitoba has been proposed for a site just southwest of Russell, but due to the greater depth of the potash and higher taxes versus Saskatchewan, progress has been stalled for the last 20 years.

Russell and the surrounding rural municipalities are promoting tourism through the Asessippi Parkland Economic Development Corp.

Education 
A semi-major service centre for the regional agricultural communities, Russell provides educational facilities ranging from day care and nursery, to post-secondary facilities. Russell is part of the Park West School Division. The Assiniboine Community College also has a regional campus located in Russell. The community has access to First Year Distant Education transmission, allowing individuals to take first-year education via internet.

Attractions and recreation 
There are a total of eight large arches along Main Street, located at each cross street, which span the intersections. The original arches were repurposed wooden support structures from a demolished hockey arena in Dauphin, and were installed in 2007. In June 2016, one of the arches crashed down on the street due to wood rot, after which the others were taken down as a safety precaution. They were replaced by steel arches in 2019.

Recreational facilities include a serviced campground, tennis courts, ball fields, curling and hockey arenas, community halls, a swimming pool, snowboarding and downhill skiing, and a nine-hole golf course.

Russell is located only  from Asessippi Provincial Park, the site of Asessippi Ski Area & Resort—a world-class ski facility and year-round family park. The park also contains  the Lake of the Prairies, a 64 km-long lake. In Manitoba, the lake recorded an annual walleye catch per square kilometre that is five times greater than the provincial average.

Climate

Notable people 
Red Dutton — NHL hall of famer
Theoren Fleury — Hockey player for Calgary Flames, New York Rangers, Chicago Blackhawks, and Colorado Avalanche
Jon Montgomery — Athlete, 2010 Olympic Games Gold Medalist in Skeleton and host of The Amazing Race Canada
Charles Arkoll Boulton — Lieutenant Colonel during North-West Rebellion
Kerri Buchberger — National volleyball player

References

External links 

Official Website

Unincorporated communities in Parkland Region, Manitoba
Unincorporated urban communities in Manitoba
Former towns in Manitoba
Populated places disestablished in 2015
2015 disestablishments in Manitoba